Andrej Kravárik (born 28 July 1971) is a Slovak-Greek former volleyball player and current coach. He spent the biggest part of his playing career at Iraklis Thessaloniki, where he enjoyed great success. He was also coach of the Slovakia men's national volleyball team.

Personal life
Kravárik is married with Maya, who is also a volleyball player. They have a daughter, Michaela (born in 1997), currently a member of Iraklis women's volleyball team.

His father is Jaroslav Kravárik, a former footballer, who played for Spartak Trnava and the Czechoslovakia national team.

Awards

Individual
 2000 Greek Cup "Most Valuable Player"
 2001 Greek Championship "Most Valuable Player"
 2001–02 CEV Indesit Champions League Final Four "Best Blocker"
 2012 Greek Championship "Most Valuable Player"

Club
 1993 Slovak Championship -  Champion, with VKP Bratislava
 1994 Slovak Championship -  Champion, with VKP Bratislava
 1997 Greek Super Cup -  Champion, with Aris Thessaloniki
 2000 Greek Cup -  Champion, with Iraklis Thessaloniki
 2002 Greek Cup -  Champion, with Iraklis Thessaloniki
 2002 Greek Championship -  Champion, with Iraklis Thessaloniki
 2004 Greek Cup -  Champion, with Iraklis Thessaloniki
 2004 Greek Super Cup -  Champion, with Iraklis Thessaloniki
 2004–05 CEV Champions League –  Runner-up, with Iraklis Thessaloniki
 2005 Greek Cup -  Champion, with Iraklis Thessaloniki
 2005 Greek Championship -  Champion, with Iraklis Thessaloniki
 2005 Greek Super Cup -  Champion, with Iraklis Thessaloniki
 2005–06 CEV Champions League –  Runner-up, with Iraklis Thessaloniki
 2006 Greek Cup -  Champion, with Iraklis Thessaloniki
 2007 Greek Championship -  Champion, with Iraklis Thessaloniki
 2007 Greek Super Cup -  Champion, with Iraklis Thessaloniki
 2008 Greek Championship -  Champion, with Iraklis Thessaloniki
 2008 Greek Super Cup -  Champion, with Iraklis Thessaloniki
 2008–09 CEV Champions League –  Runner-up, with Iraklis Thessaloniki
 2012 Greek Cup -  Champion, with Iraklis Thessaloniki
 2012 Greek Championship -  Champion, with Iraklis Thessaloniki

National team

With Slovakia
 1997 European Championship - 8th place

With Greece
 2004 FIVB World League - 5th place
 2004 Summer Olympics - 5th place

References

External links
FIVB profile
CEV profile

1971 births
Living people
Sportspeople from Piešťany
Slovak men's volleyball players
Greek men's volleyball players
Volleyball players at the 2004 Summer Olympics
Olympic volleyball players of Greece
Iraklis V.C. players
Aris V.C. players
PAOK V.C. players
Expatriate volleyball players in Italy
Greek volleyball coaches
Slovak volleyball coaches